Hamilton, New Jersey is the name of several places in the U.S. state of New Jersey:

Hamilton Township, Atlantic County, New Jersey
Hamilton Township, Mercer County, New Jersey
Hamilton, Monmouth County, New Jersey

See also
Hamilton Township (disambiguation)

New Jersey township disambiguation pages